Kimberly Nixon is a transgender woman who filed a human rights complaint against Vancouver Rape Relief & Women's Shelter Society (VRRS) for discrimination. VRRS argued that Nixon, a transgender woman, did not have the same life experiences as a woman who was assigned female at birth, and could not volunteer as a peer rape counselor. She fought her case successively through the British Columbia Human Rights Tribunal, the Supreme Court of British Columbia, the British Columbia Court of Appeal, each of which rejected her complaint, and then eventually the Supreme Court of Canada, which dismissed her request to appeal the decision against her case on February 1, 2007.

Personal life
Nixon is a post-operative transgender woman. She was born male at birth and realized from an early age that her physical sex did not align with her sense of self. She lived privately as a transgender woman and publicly as a male until 1990 when she underwent sex reassignment surgery alongside hormone replacement therapy at age 33. Following her surgery, Nixon’s birth certificate was amended, identifying her as a female.

As a survivor of male violence and sexual assault as a transgender woman, Nixon had previously received aid and volunteered with Battered Women’s Support Service (BWSS) as well as another halfway house that helped women in crisis. Inspired by her own past experience, Nixon applied to volunteer at Vancouver Rape Relief Society, a non-profit organization that provides services for women who have been victims of male violence. Following Nixon’s successful prescreening, she was rejected by the society based upon her biological sex as a male-born transgender woman.

Human rights complaint
Nixon alleged that Vancouver Rape Relief discriminated against her violating the British Columbia Human Rights Code. The society argued that they didn’t allow males into the group and to qualify as a volunteer she must have been a woman who experienced sex-based oppression from birth. They argued that Nixon was socialized as a man and thus, did not have the proper life experiences of a woman. Other Rape Relief trainers supported this position identifying Nixon as a man, which justified her rejection from the volunteer position.

In August 1995, Nixon filed a formal human rights complaint against VRRS. This resulted in Nixon receiving a formal letter apologizing for her exclusion, $500 in compensation, and an offer for an in-person apology. Nixon rejected these offers and in 2000 the case went to the British Columbia Human Rights Tribunal. Nixon won the Human Rights Tribunal on the grounds that the society discriminated against her and was awarded $7,500 for injury of self-respect and dignity. Vancouver Rape Relief Society brought the Tribunal’s decision for judicial review, establishing that discrimination was not present.

Vancouver Rape Relief Society v. Nixon
In August 2003, the decision was brought to the Supreme Court of British Columbia. The court was to decide "whether transgendered women are protected from discrimination on the basis of sex". The court debated gender, biological indicators against social, psychological, psychiatric and legal treatment. On December 19, 2003, the Supreme Court decided that there was an error in judgement in the previous tribunal. The Vancouver Rape Relief was not guilty of discrimination based on the group’s right of freedom of association. This meant that the group had the right to organize as female-only space, irrespective of gender identity.

Following this decision Nixon appealed to the British Columbia Court of Appeal who unanimously maintained the previous decision by the Supreme Court of BC. They held that Vancouver Rape Relief Society was protected under the Human Rights Code, Section 41. This allowed the society to abide by its  female-only membership policy, based on its rational and interests in serving women. On February 1, 2007, the Supreme Court of Canada dismissed Nixon’s request to appeal the decision. Nixon was also charged with covering the awarded costs of Vancouver Rape Relief, which she has refused to pay.

References

Canadian LGBT rights case law
Canadian transgender case law
British Columbia case law
Women in British Columbia